In 1845, the Republic of Texas was annexed to the United States of America, becoming the 28th U.S. state. Border disputes between the new state and Mexico, which had never recognized Texas independence and still considered the area a renegade Mexican state, led to the Mexican–American War (1846–1848). When the war concluded, Mexico relinquished its claim on Texas, as well as other regions in what is now the southwestern United States.
Texas' annexation as a state that tolerated slavery had caused tension in the United States among slave states and those that did not allow slavery. The tension was partially defused with the Compromise of 1850, in which Texas ceded some of its territory to the federal government to become non-slave-owning areas but gained El Paso.

Annexation

The Republic of Texas had formed in 1836, after breaking away from Mexico in the Texas Revolution.  The following year, an ambassador from Texas approached the United States about the possibility of becoming an American state.  Fearing a war with Mexico, which did not recognize Texas independence, the United States declined the offer.  In 1844, James K. Polk was elected the United States president after promising to annex Texas.  Before he assumed office, the outgoing president, John Tyler, entered negotiations with Texas.  On February 26, 1845, six days before Polk took office, the U.S. Congress approved the annexation.  The Texas legislature approved annexation in July 1845 and constructed a state constitution.  In October, Texas residents approved the annexation and the new constitution, and Texas was officially inducted into the United States on December 29, 1845.

Mexican–American War

When Texas was annexed, Mexico broke diplomatic relations with the United States. The annexation bill did not specifically define the boundaries of Texas. The former republic claimed the Rio Grande as its southern border, while Mexican authorities had always considered the Nueces River, situated further north, to be the boundary of Mexican Texas. The United States sent John Slidell to negotiate with the Mexican government, offering $25 million ($ today) to set the Texas border at the Rio Grande and to purchase Mexico's provinces of Alta California and Santa Fe de Nuevo México. Popular sentiment in Mexico was against any sale, and the army deposed President José Joaquín de Herrera when he appeared inclined to negotiate with Slidell.

The United States positioned troops along the Rio Grande. On April 25, 1846, in an event known as the Thornton Affair, a large contingent of Mexican cavalry attacked an American patrol in the area between the Rio Grande and the Nueces, killing 16 Americans. On May 3, Mexican troops initiated the siege of Fort Texas, bombarding a makeshift American fort along the Rio Grande. On May 8, Zachary Taylor led 2,500 U.S. troops to relieve the fort.  He was intercepted by Mexican troops, leading to the Battle of Palo Alto. Mexican troops retreated a short distance to regroup, and the following day the two sides fought fiercely in the Battle of Resaca de la Palma. The U.S. cavalry captured the Mexican artillery, and the Mexican soldiers retreated.

The United States officially declared war against Mexico on May 13. Mexico declared war against the U.S. on July 7. Throughout the official hostilities, the United States maintained two fronts—one in the Mexican interior south of the Rio Grande, and one in California. There was no further fighting in Texas.

The war ended on February 2, 1848, with the signing of the Treaty of Guadalupe Hidalgo. Mexico ceded claims to Texas, and the border was set at the Rio Grande.

Compromise of 1850
The expansion of the United States  after the Mexican–American War led to tensions between the slave and free states as to how to maintain the balance between the opposing viewpoints.  Texas had been admitted to the United States as a slave state, yet Texas claimed territory north of the 36°30' demarcation line for slavery set by the 1820 Missouri Compromise.  According to the annexation agreement, if Texas were to be subdivided into multiple states, those north of the compromise line would become free states.  Following the conclusion of the Mexican–American War, Texas also tried to exert control over much of New Mexico.

In an effort to avoid some states seceding from the United States, Congress passed the Compromise of 1850.  Texas gave up much of the western territories it had claimed in exchange for $10 million to pay off previous debts.

Settlement
Post-war Texas grew rapidly as migrants poured into the cotton lands of the state. German immigrants started to arrive in the early 1840s because of economic, social and political conditions in their states. In 1842, German nobles organized the Adelsverein, banding together to buy land in central Texas to enable German settlement. The Revolutions of 1848 acted as another catalyst for so many immigrants that they became known as the "Forty-Eighters." Many were educated artisans and businessmen. Germans continued to arrive in considerable numbers until 1890.

The first Czech immigrants started their journey to Texas on August 19, 1851 headed by Jozef Šilar. The rich farmland of Central Texas attracted the Czech immigrants. The counties of Austin, Fayette, Lavaca, and Washington had early Czech settlements. The Czech-American communities are characterized by a strong sense of community and social clubs were a dominant theme of Czech-American life in Texas. By 1865, the Czech population numbered 700 and climbed to over 60,000 Czech-Americans by 1940.

With their investments in cotton cultivation, Texas planters imported enslaved blacks from the earliest years of settlement. They established cotton plantations mostly in the eastern part of the state, where labor was done by enslaved African Americans. The central area of the state had more subsistence farmers.

Indian wars

In the late 1850s, settlers continued to push west and north, and by 1856 had begun settling, parts of the Comancheria in large numbers. Angry at the loss of their traditional hunting grounds, several bands of Comanche conducted raids on Texas settlers. In an effort to stop the violence and subdue the Comanche, in 1858 the Texas Rangers paired with members of the Tonkawa tribe—traditionally, enemies of the Comanche—for the Antelope Hills Expedition. Federal law promised Indian tribes safety in Indian Territory, located just north of Texas. Nevertheless, the Rangers crossed into Indian Territory and attacked a Comanche village at the Battle of Little Robe Creek. This was the first time any American forces had penetrated to the heart of the Comancheria, attacked Comanche villages with impunity, and successfully made it home.  The expedition exhausted the annual Texas defense budget, and the governor disbanded the Rangers.

References

Sources
T.R. Fehrenbach, Lone Star: A History of Texas and Texans (Cambridge: Da Capo Press, 2000)

External links
A Continent Divided: The U.S.-Mexico War, Center for Greater Southwestern Studies, the University of Texas at Arlington

History of Texas by period